In convex geometry, the Mahler volume of a centrally symmetric convex body is a dimensionless quantity that is associated with the body and is invariant under linear transformations. It is named after German-English mathematician Kurt Mahler. It is known that the shapes with the largest possible Mahler volume are the balls and solid ellipsoids; this is now known as the Blaschke–Santaló inequality. The still-unsolved Mahler conjecture states that the minimum possible Mahler volume is attained by a hypercube.

Definition
A convex body in Euclidean space is defined as a compact convex set with non-empty interior.  If  is a centrally symmetric convex body in -dimensional Euclidean space, the polar body  is another centrally symmetric body in the same space, defined as the set

If  is an invertible linear transformation, then .

Examples
The polar body of an -dimensional unit sphere is itself another unit sphere. Thus, its Mahler volume is just the square of its volume, 

where  is the Gamma function.
By affine invariance, any ellipsoid has the same Mahler volume.

The polar body of a polyhedron or polytope is its dual polyhedron or dual polytope. In particular, the polar body of a cube or hypercube is an octahedron or cross polytope. Its Mahler volume can be calculated as

Extreme shapes

The Blaschke–Santaló inequality states that the shapes with maximum Mahler volume are the spheres and ellipsoids. The three-dimensional case of this result was proven by Wilhelm Blaschke; the full result was proven much later by  using a technique known as Steiner symmetrization by which any centrally symmetric convex body can be replaced with a more sphere-like body without decreasing its Mahler volume.

The shapes with the minimum known Mahler volume are hypercubes, cross polytopes, and more generally the Hanner polytopes which include these two types of shapes, as well as their affine transformations. The Mahler conjecture states that the Mahler volume of these shapes is the smallest of any n-dimensional symmetric convex body; it remains unsolved when . As Terry Tao writes:

 prove that the Mahler volume is bounded below by  times the volume of a sphere for some absolute constant , matching the scaling behavior of the hypercube volume but with a smaller constant.  proves that, more concretely, one can take  in this bound.  A result of this type is known as a reverse Santaló inequality.

Partial results
  proved that the unit cube is a strict local minimizer for the Mahler volume in the class of origin-symmetric convex bodies endowed with the Banach–Mazur distance.

For asymmetric bodies
The Mahler volume can be defined in the same way, as the product of the volume and the polar volume, for convex bodies whose interior contains the origin regardless of symmetry. Mahler conjectured that, for this generalization, the minimum volume is obtained by a simplex, with its centroid at the origin. As with the symmetric Mahler conjecture, reverse Santaló inequalities are known showing that the minimum volume is at least within an exponential factor of the simplex.

Notes

References

 Revised and reprinted in 

Convex geometry
Geometric inequalities
Volume